The 2016–17 Alabama–Huntsville Chargers ice hockey team represented the University of Alabama in Huntsville in the 2016–17 NCAA Division I men's ice hockey season. The Chargers were coached by Mike Corbett who was in his fourth season as head coach. His assistant coaches were Gavin Morgan and Matty Thomas. The Chargers played their home games in the Propst Arena at the Von Braun Center and competed in the Western Collegiate Hockey Association.

Recruiting
UAH added 4 freshmen for the 2016–17 season, including 2 forwards and 2 defensemen.

Roster

Departures from 2015–16 team
James Block, F
Chad Brears, F, Graduated, signed with the Pensacola Ice Flyers (SPHL)
Frank Misuraca, D, Graduated, signed with the Peoria Rivermen (SPHL)
Jack Prince, F, Graduated, signed with the Manchester Storm (EIHL)
Anderson White, D, Graduated

Additionally, Brandon Carlson's NCAA eligibility expired November 19, due to classes he had taken before enrolling at UAH.

2016–17 team
Source:

|}

Schedule and results
  Green background indicates win.
  Red background indicates loss.
  Yellow background indicates tie.

|-
!colspan=12 style=""| Regular Season

Standings

Player stats
As of February 25, 2017

Skaters

Goalies

References

Alabama–Huntsville Chargers men's ice hockey seasons
Alabama Huntsville
Alabama-Huntsville Chargers men's ice hockey
Alabama-Huntsville Chargers men's ice hockey